Gzy-Wisnowa  is a village in the administrative district of Gmina Gzy, within Pułtusk County, Masovian Voivodeship, in east-central Poland.

References

Gzy-Wisnowa